The Davidowitz Museum of Aphoristics is a private literary and art museum; the first and only museum of briefly-expressed thoughts in the world.

History 
The museum was founded in 1977 by the aphorism writer Arkady Davidowitz and the artist Valentina Zolotykh, whose paintings illustrate for the author's books. Arkady Davidovitz was one of the authors of the popular magazine Krokodil, but Soviet censorship forbade the publication of many of his aforisms because of their sharp satirical content. Then Valentina Zolotykh began to write these forbidden aphorisms on the walls of the studio apartment. Thus began the history of the museum of forbidden aphоristics.

Building 
The museum is located in the old part of Voronezh, at number 73 along Sacco and Vanzetti street. The house was built in 1953 by German prisoners of war. The museum preserves the bohemian interior of the era of the real socialism of the 1970s. The development of a virtual museum of aphoristics began in 2020, due to the COVID-19 pandemic.

Collection 
The museum's funds contain more than 50,000 items, including manuscripts and books, furniture and personal belongings of the writer, as well as paintings and sketches by Valentina and Anna Zolotykh.

Gallery

Further reading
 Je Suis Davidowitz, 2015
 Davidowitz Te Ching //  大卫的后裔德经 ( 达维多维奇格言录 ), 2020

References 

Buildings and structures in Voronezh Oblast
Literary museums in Russia
Tourist attractions in Voronezh Oblast
Museums established in 1977